Ron Mills (9 March 1938 – 23 August 2015) was an Australian rules footballer who played with North Melbourne in the Victorian Football League (VFL).

Notes

External links 

2015 deaths
1938 births
Australian rules footballers from Victoria (Australia)
North Melbourne Football Club players